Lars Ove Moen (born 15 November 1959) is a retired Norwegian race walker.

He represented Norway during the 1984 Summer Olympics, where we finished at 13th place.

Achievements

External links

Norwegian international athletes - M

1959 births
Living people
Norwegian male racewalkers

Athletes (track and field) at the 1984 Summer Olympics
Olympic athletes of Norway

Norwegian athletes
20th-century Norwegian people